Time-resolved two-photon photoelectron (2PPE) spectroscopy is a time-resolved spectroscopy technique which is used to study electronic structure and electronic excitations at surfaces. The technique utilizes femtosecond to picosecond laser pulses in order to first photoexcite an electron. After a time delay, the excited electron is photoemitted into a free electron state by a second pulse. The kinetic energy and the emission angle of the photoelectron are measured in an electron energy analyzer. To facilitate investigations on the population and relaxation pathways of the excitation, this measurement is performed at different time delays.

This technique has been used for many different types of materials to study a variety of exotic electron behaviors, including image potential states at metal surfaces, and electron dynamics at molecular interfaces.

Basic physics 
The final kinetic energy of the electron can be modeled by 

where the EB is the binding energy of the initial state, Ekin is the kinetic energy of the photoemitted electron, Φ is the work function of the material in question, and Epump, Eprobe are the photon energies of the laser pulses, respectively. Without a time delay, this equation is exact. However, as the delay between the pump and probe pulses increases, the excited electron may relax in an energy. Hence the energy of the photoemitted electron is lowered. With large enough time delay between the two pulses, the electron will relax all the way back to its original state. The timescales at which the electronic relaxation occurs, as well as the relaxation mechanism (either via vibronic coupling or electronic coupling) is of interest for applications of functional devices such as solar cells and light-emitting diodes.

Experimental configuration 

Time-resolved two-photon photoelectron spectroscopy usually employs a combination of ultrafast optical technology as well as ultrahigh vacuum components. The main optical component is an ultrafast (femtosecond) laser system which generates pulses in the near infrared. Nonlinear optics are used to generate photon energies in the visible and ultraviolet spectral range. Typically, ultraviolet radiation is required to photoemit electrons. In order to allow for time-resolved experiments, a fine adjustment delay stage must be employed in order to manipulate the time delay between the pump and the probe pulse.

See also
Angle-resolved photoemission spectroscopy
Laser-based angle-resolved photoemission spectroscopy
Ultrafast laser spectroscopy
Time-resolved spectroscopy

References

Emission spectroscopy
Ultrafast spectroscopy
Electron spectroscopy